2010 Turkish Open is a darts tournament, which took place in Turkey on October 24, 2010.

Results

References

2010 in darts
2010 in Turkish sport
Darts in Turkey